Euerythra phasma, the red-tailed specter,  is a moth of the family Erebidae. It was described by Leon F. Harvey in 1876. It is found in the south-central United States, including Alabama, Arkansas, Florida, Georgia, Kentucky, Mississippi, Missouri, Oklahoma, Tennessee and Texas.

References

Phaegopterina
Moths described in 1876

Taxa named by Leon F. Harvey